Sam Bennett is a fictional character from the NBC/DirecTV soap opera, Passions, portrayed by James Hyde.

Early life 
Samuel Benjamin "Sam" Bennett II was born in Harmony on July 7, 1954. He is the third child of ten children and the third son of ten sons born to Samuel Benjamin Bennett I (born March 17, 1925 – 1998) and Margaret Bennett (née Joyce) (born August 23, 1929 – 2005). His father Sam was the former Harmony Chief of Police. Sam would eventually follow in his father's footsteps and become the Harmony Chief of Police himself in 1999. Sam has nine brothers: Timothy Bennett (1950), Zachariah Bennett (1952), Casey Bennett (1955), Gavin Bennett (1957), Lachlan Bennett (1959), Neil Bennett (1960), Nathan Bennett (1963), Simon Bennett (1969), and Hank Bennett (1972), who is not much older than Sam's eldest son Ethan (born 1975). He is the widower and former husband of Grace Bennett (born November 12, 1955). He had three children with Grace: Noah Bennett (born June 11, 1980), Kay Bennett (born January 29, 1984), and Jessica Bennett (born October 5, 1985). Sam also has a son named Ethan Winthrop (born March 9, 1975) from his previous relationship with his first love and high school sweetheart Ivy Winthrop. Growing up, Sam was best friends with T. C.  Russell since childhood and is still very close with him to this day.

Character history

Sam is the eldest son of the Harmony chief of police, and later becomes chief of police himself. He has a younger brother named Hank Bennett, who is not much older than Sam's eldest son. Growing up, Sam had a best friend T.C. Russell, and they remain close.

When Sam is a teenager, he falls for Ivy Winthrop, daughter of Governor Harrison Winthrop, whom he meets while working as a lifeguard. One summer, he goes away to work on one of Ivy's father's boats so he can afford to marry her. However, his letters to her are intercepted by father, and she thinks Sam has forgotten about her and is seeing other women.

She begins to date Alistair Crane's son Julian. Since the Winthrop and Crane families are both affluent, the two patriarchs think a marriage between their children is far superior to Ivy marrying a Bennett. But the night she marries Julian, Ivy realizes she does not love him and had succumbed to her father's wishes. Ivy runs off to find comfort in the arms of Sam. Ivy gives birth to Sam's son Ethan, but she passes him off as Julian's son. She chooses to stay with Julian because Sam has no money. Ivy and Julian go on to have three children: Fancy Crane, Fox Crane and Pretty Crane. However, Ivy dotes on Ethan because he is Sam's child.

Sam leaves Harmony for several years and goes to Boston where he saves a woman named Grace Standish from a fire. She later suffers from amnesia, though the two fall in love. Sam and Grace marry and have three children of their own: Noah Bennett, Kay Bennett and Jessica Bennett. They stay together for 20 years.

1999–2008

In August 1999, Ivy and Sam see each other for the first time since 1974. Ivy decides to come back into Sam's life and does everything in her power to break up his marriage. The revelation that Ethan is actually Sam's son causes friction in Sam and Grace's marriage, as well as causing Grace to miscarry in shock.

Ivy blackmails photographer David Hastings into pretending to be Grace's first husband, from before the fire that took her memory. Grace leaves Sam for David, believing David is her first husband.

When Hurricane Peggy hits Harmony, Ivy helps Sam place a beacon on the lighthouse to save teenagers, including the Bennett girls, who are stranded on an island after a school trip. Ivy is struck by lightning, falls, and becomes paralyzed. In time, Sam and Ivy reconnect, and after Julian divorces Ivy, she moves in with Sam.

In late October 2006, Ivy's secret is revealed when Miguel Lopez-Fitzgerald presses Sam's daughter Kay to reveal what has been causing her pain. Much to Ivy's horror, Kay reveals the truth, and Sam believes her. Sam subsequently tells Ivy to leave, causing a scene and trashing the kitchen in the process, and telling Ivy that if she is not out of his house by the time he returns home, he will not be responsible for his own destructive actions.

Grace, upon learning the truth about Ivy's plot, decides to come home and reunite with Sam. However, she dies when a bomb explodes on the bus, she is taking to the airport to return to Harmony. This sends Sam and their children into mourning. He forgives Ivy for what she did to Grace, but they do not get together.

Sam and Eve walk in on Ivy and Julian having drunken sex. Several months later Sam and Ivy would become a couple again.

Hidden Passions
In the book Hidden Passions, Sam's parents were named Benjamin Bennett (on the show he was also Sam) and Margaret Joyce. He had at least two more brothers.

See also
 Bennett and Standish families

References

External links

soapcentral.com|PS Online
Sam at Soap Central
Sam Bennett at NBC.com

Passions characters
Fictional American police officers
Fictional lifeguards
Male characters in television
Television characters introduced in 1999